Bahreh-ye Ruzeh (also Romanized as Bahreh-ye Rūzeh) is a village in Saroleh Rural District, Meydavud District, Bagh-e Malek County, Khuzestan Province, Iran. At the 2006 census, its population was 17, in 5 families.

References 

Populated places in Bagh-e Malek County